Howmeh Rural District is a rural district (dehestan) in the Central District of Saravan County, Sistan and Baluchestan province, Iran. At the 2006 census, its population was 31,815, in 6,042 families. At the 2016 census, its population had risen to 41,735.

References 

Saravan County
Rural Districts of Sistan and Baluchestan Province
Populated places in Saravan County